Aplatophis is a genus of eels in the snake-eel family Ophichthidae with these species:

 Aplatophis chauliodus J. E. Böhlke, 1956 (fangtooth snake-eel)
 Aplatophis zorro McCosker & D. R. Robertson, 2001 (snaggle-toothed snake-eel)

References

 

Ophichthidae